Phil Sharp (1911 – 1980) was an American producer and screenwriter. He won an Primetime Emmy Award and was nominated for one more in the category Outstanding Writing for a Comedy Series, for his work on the television programs, The Phil Silvers Show and All in the Family. Sharp died of a heart attack in 1980.

References

External links 

1911 births
1980 deaths
American male screenwriters
American television writers
American male television writers
American comedy writers
American television producers
Primetime Emmy Award winners